Sushma Shiromani is an actress, IMPPA (Indian Motion Pictures' Producers Association) vice-president and director, known for Kanoon (1994), Pyar ka Karz (1990) and Bijli and Marathi films like Bhingari, Fadakadi, and Kadak Lakshmi.

Filmography

Marathi films
 Bhingari (1976)
 Fatakadi (1979)
 Mosambi Narangi (1981)
 Bhannat Bhanu (1982)
 Gulchhadi (1984)
 Bijlee (1986)

Hindi films as a producer
 Pyar Ka Karz (1990)
 Kanoon (1994; also director)

Hindi Films

Sawan Bhadon (1970)

See also
Marathi cinema

References

External links

Actresses in Marathi cinema
20th-century Indian actresses
Year of birth missing (living people)
Living people